B. W. Canady House is a historic home located at Kinston, Lenoir County, North Carolina. It was built about 1883, and is a two-story, "L"-shaped, Italianate style frame dwelling. It has a gable roof, gabled two-story projecting central entrance bay, and one-story rear wing.  It features a wraparound front porch, pendant eave brackets, a paneled frieze, and tall brick interior chimneys with elaborate panelled stacks and corbelled caps.

It was listed on the National Register of Historic Places in 1989.

References

Houses on the National Register of Historic Places in North Carolina
Italianate architecture in North Carolina
Houses completed in 1883
Houses in Lenoir County, North Carolina
National Register of Historic Places in Lenoir County, North Carolina